Plesioagathomerus is a genus of beetles in the family Megalopodidae, containing the following species:

 Plesioagathomerus atrodiscalis Pic, 1947
 Plesioagathomerus bilineatus Pic, 1947
 Plesioagathomerus canus Monrós, 1945
 Plesioagathomerus vittatus Monrós, 1945

References

Megalopodidae genera